Thomas Hinman Moorer (February 9, 1912 – February 5, 2004) was an admiral and naval aviator in the United States Navy who served as the chief of naval operations from 1967 to 1970, and as the seventh chairman of the Joint Chiefs of Staff from 1970 to 1974. He was implicated in a spy ring within the White House during the Nixon administration, but never prosecuted.

Early life, education, and ancestry
Moorer was born in Mount Willing, Alabama on February 9, 1912. His father, a dentist, named his son for his favorite professor at Atlanta-Southern Dental College, Dr. Thomas Hinman. Moorer was raised in Eufaula, Alabama with his siblings, including his brother Joseph, who would also become a Navy Admiral.

On March 31, 1970 he became a member of the Alabama Society of the Sons of the American Revolution (SAR). He was assigned national SAR member number 99,634 and Alabama Society number 759. He was later awarded the Society's Gold Good Citizenship Medal. He was also a member of the Naval Order of the United States.

Naval career

Moorer graduated from the United States Naval Academy on June 1, 1933 and was commissioned an ensign.

World War II
In addition to his carrier-based fighter experience, Moorer also qualified in seaplanes and flew with a patrol squadron in the early years of World War II. Serving with Patrol Squadron Twenty-Two at Pearl Harbor, Hawaii, when the Japanese Empire attacked on December 7, 1941 Moorer's account of Pearl Harbor attack has been published under the title "A Patrol in the wrong direction".His squadron subsequently participated in the 1941–42 Dutch East Indies Campaign in the southwest Pacific, where he flew numerous combat missions. Moorer received a Purple Heart after being shot down and wounded off the coast of Australia on 19 February 1942 and then surviving an attack on the rescue ship, which was bombed and sunk the same day by enemy aircraft involved in the first Bombing of Darwin. Moorer also received the Distinguished Flying Cross for his valor three months later when he braved Japanese air superiority to fly supplies into, and evacuate wounded out of, the island of Timor.

Vietnam War
Promoted to vice admiral in 1962, and to admiral in 1964, Moorer served both as Commander-in-Chief of the United States Pacific Fleet and Commander-in-Chief of the United States Atlantic Fleet — the first Navy officer to have commanded both fleets. Moorer was Commander-in-Chief of the Pacific Fleet at the time of the Gulf of Tonkin incident and ordered an internal investigation into the conflicting reports which emerged following the event.

Moorer served as the Chief of Naval Operations between 1967 and 1970, at the height of U.S. involvement in Vietnam and worked closely with the most senior officers in the U.S. Military and Government.

Attack on the USS Liberty
Moorer came to the conclusion that the attack on the USS Liberty in 1967 was a deliberate act on the part of the Israelis and that President Lyndon B. Johnson ordered the cover-up to maintain ties with Israel. Moorer stated that "Israel attempted to prevent the Liberty's radio operators from sending a call for help by jamming American emergency radio channels.[And that] Israeli torpedo boats machine-gunned lifeboats at close range that had been lowered to rescue the most-seriously wounded." Moorer stated that there had been a conspiracy to cover up the event and asked whether "our government put Israel's interests ahead of our own? If so, Why? Does our government continue to subordinate American interests to Israeli interests?" In a 1983 interview, Moorer said:  "I've never seen a President . . . stand up to them [Zionists]. If the American people understood what a grip those people have got on our government, they would rise up in arms.” Admiral Moorer was present at the Medal of Honor presentation ceremony for the Liberty’s commanding officer, Captain William L. McGonagle. Captain McGonagle was presented the award by the Secretary of the Navy away from the White House, which broke with longstanding tradition of such awards being presented by the President in a public ceremony (McGonagle’s Medal of Honor is the only one to be awarded in such a manner). Admiral Moorer explained this was because the attack on the USS Liberty had been covered-up by the incumbent presidential administration. Moorer told The Washington Post in 1991: “To suggest that they couldn’t identify the ship is…ridiculous…Anybody who could not identify the Liberty could not tell the difference between the White House and the Washington Monument.” Moorer remained an outspoken advocate for Liberty survivors: “It’s ridiculous to say this was an accident. There was good weather, she was flying the U.S. flag and the planes and torpedo boats attacked over a long period of time. I think Congress should investigate the incident, even now.” Moorer wrote in 1997: “I have never believed that the attack on the USS Liberty was a case of mistaken identity. That is ridiculous. I have flown over the Atlantic and Pacific oceans, thousands of hours, searching for ships and identifying all types of ships at sea. The Liberty was the ugliest, strangest-looking ship in the U.S. Navy. As a communications intelligence ship, it was sprouting every kind of antenna. It looked like a lobster with all those projections moving every which way. Israel knew perfectly well that the ship was American.”

Chairman of the Joint Chiefs of Staff
Moorer served as the Chairman of the Joint Chiefs of Staff from 1970 until 1974.

While Chairman of the Joint Chiefs of Staff, Moorer personally masterminded the 1972 mining of Hai Phong Harbor and believed that if such an operation had been conducted in 1964 it would have "made a significant difference in the outcome of the war."

Excerpts from Moorer's diary during his time as Chairman of the Joint Chiefs of Staff were recently declassified, and includes a note about an Air Force general telling the Joint Chiefs of Staff during a 1971 meeting that in a nuclear war the United States “could lose two hundred million people and still have more than we had at the time of the Civil War.” In December 1972, President Nixon ordered Operation Linebacker II, better known as the Christmas Bombings, saying to Moorer on 14 December: "I don't want any more of this crap about the fact that we couldn't hit this target or that one. This is your chance to use military power to win this war, and if you don't, I'll hold you responsible".

While chairman, Moorer was fed a steady diet of confidential documents that had been stolen by a Joint Chiefs of Staff spy ring within the White House overseen by Admiral Robert Welander, the JCS liaison officer to the National Security Council. Welander was supplied with documents stolen by Navy Yeoman Charles Radford from White House desks and burn bags and the briefcases of Henry Kissinger and Gen. Alexander Haig, among other places in the White House. The spy ring operated for about 13 months before being uncovered by Nixon aide John Ehrlichman. Welander and Radford admitted to the thefts, felonies under the Espionage Act. Welander and Radford eventually were transferred to remote military outposts. Attorney General John Mitchell informed Moorer that the administration knew of the spy ring, but Nixon, apparently concerned about the potential political fallout, ordered that no prosecution take place. 

Upon completion of his second two-year term as CJCS, Moorer retired from the Navy on July 1, 1974.

Death and legacy
In an interview with the journalist Stanley Karnow in 1981, Moorer expressed much bitterness about how the Vietnam War was fought, saying: "We should have fought in the north, where everyone was the enemy, where you didn't have to worry whether or not you were shooting friendly civilians. In the south, we had to cope with women concealing grenades in their brassieres, or in their baby's diapers. I remember two of our Marines being killed by a youngster who they were teaching to play volleyball. But Lyndon Johnson didn't want to overthrow the North Vietnamese government. Well, the only reason to go to war is to overthrow a government you don't like".

Moorer died on February 5, 2004, at the U.S. Naval Hospital in Bethesda, Maryland at the age of 91. He is buried at Arlington National Cemetery.

The National Guard Armory (Fort Thomas H. Moorer Armory) in Fort Deposit, Alabama is named after Moorer, as is a middle school in Eufaula, Alabama.

Dates of rank

At the time of Admiral Moorer's promotion, all rear admirals wore two stars, but the rank was divided into an "upper" and "lower half" for pay purposes

Awards and decorations

U.S. military personal decorations, unit awards, campaign awards

Foreign orders and decorations
He also has been decorated by thirteen foreign governments:
  Portugal (Military Order of Aviz, Grand Cross);
 Greece (Silver Star Medal, First Class);
  Japan (Order of Double Rays of the Rising Sun)
  Japan (First Class of the Grand Cordon of the Order of the Rising Sun);
  Republic of China (Precious Tripod (Pao-Ting) Medal with Red Grand Cordon)
  Republic of China (Order of Cloud and Banner (Yun Hui) with Special Grand Cordon);
  Philippine Legion of Honor (Rank of Commander)
  Brazil (Order of the Naval Merit, Grande Official);
  Chile (Gran Estrella al Merito Militar);
  Venezuela (Order of Naval Merit 1st Class);
  Republic of Korea (Order of National Security Merit, 1st Class);
  Netherlands (Grand Cross, Order of Orange-Nassau with Swords);
  Federal Republic of Germany (Commander's Cross of the Order of Merit);
  Italy (Military Order of Italy, Knight of the Grand Cross);
  Spain (Grand Cross of the Order of Naval Merit);
  Norway (Grand Cross of the Order of St. Olav).

Civilian awards
 Stephen Decatur Award for Operational Competence by the Navy League of the United States (May 1964)
 Honorary Doctor of Laws Degree awarded by Auburn University (1968)
 General William Mitchell Award, Wings Club of New York City (February 1968)
 Member, Alabama Academy of Honor (August 1969)
 Honorary Doctor of Humanities Degree awarded by Samford University (May 1970)
 Frank M. Hawks Award for Outstanding Contributions to the Development of Aviation by the American Legion Air Service Post 501, New York City (January 1971)
 The Gray Eagle Award presented at the Washington Navy Yard (June 29, 1972)
 Gold Good Citizenship Medal, Sons of the American Revolution
 National Aviation Hall of Fame (1987)
 The Lone Sailor Award by the U. S. Navy Memorial Foundation (1989)
 The National Football Foundation Gold Medal (1990)
 The Alabama Men’s Hall of Fame (2018)

References

Bibliography

External links

 

|-

|-

|-

|-

|-

1912 births
2004 deaths
Aviators from Alabama
Burials at Arlington National Cemetery
Chairmen of the Joint Chiefs of Staff
Chiefs of Naval Operations
Joint Chiefs of Staff
Military personnel from Alabama
Naval War College alumni
People from Lowndes County, Alabama
United States Navy pilots of World War II
United States Naval Academy alumni

Recipients of the Defense Distinguished Service Medal
Recipients of the Navy Distinguished Service Medal
Recipients of the Distinguished Flying Cross (United States)
Recipients of the Silver Star
Recipients of the Legion of Merit
Grand Crosses of the Order of Aviz
Knights Grand Cross of the Order of Orange-Nassau
Commanders Crosses of the Order of Merit of the Federal Republic of Germany
Recipients of the Order of the Rising Sun
Recipients of the Order of the Sacred Tripod
Recipients of the Philippine Legion of Honor
Order of National Security Merit members
Recipients of the Order of Naval Merit (Brazil)
People from Eufaula, Alabama
Recipients of the Distinguished Service Medal (US Army)
Recipients of the Coast Guard Distinguished Service Medal